Vicki Anderson (born Myra Barnes; November 21, 1939) is an American soul singer best known for her performances with the James Brown Revue. She recorded a number of singles under both her birth and stage names. She is the widow of Bobby Byrd and the mother of Carleen Anderson.

Life and career
She was born in Houston, Texas. Anderson joined Brown in 1965, replacing Anna King, and stayed for three years as his main female singer, until replaced by Marva Whitney in 1968. She rejoined in 1969 after Marva departed, staying for a further three years until 1972, after which Lyn Collins took over from her. Brown claimed in his autobiography that Anderson was the best singer he ever had in his revue. 

In 1970, she released her most famous song, the feminist anthem "The Message from the Soul Sisters." A single on James' I-Dentify label by Momie-O appeared in 1975 featuring a cover of Rufus' hit "Once You Get Started" and Bobby Womack's "Stop On By". Anderson toured the UK with the James Brown Funky People Revue in the late 1980s and again with husband Bobby Byrd, the original founder of The Famous Flames, in the mid-1990s.

Anderson married Byrd in the mid-1960s, and is the mother of UK-based Carleen, who released albums since the 1990s.

References

1939 births
Living people
Musicians from Houston
African-American women singers
American soul singers
American funk singers
James Brown vocalists
King Records artists